Sir Edward Crew  (born 13 January 1946) was the Chief Constable of Northamptonshire Police from 1993-1996, and of West Midlands Police from August 1996-2002. 

Crew joined the Metropolitan Police as a Cadet in 1965. He rose through the ranks to chief superintendent and was appointed to Kent County Constabulary where he served as an assistant and the deputy chief constable.  

In 1988, he attended the Royal College of Defence Studies. In 1993, he was appointed chief constable of Northamptonshire Police and, in 1996, he was appointed chief constable for the West Midlands. He was awarded the Queen's Police Medal for Distinguished Service in 1990 and was appointed a Deputy Lieutenant on 8 October 1999. He was knighted in 2001 and in the same year awarded an honorary doctorate of laws at Birmingham University. He was knighted in the 2001 New Years Honours List.

In 2011–2012, Crewe provided advice and research support to Tom Winsor during his Independent Review of Police Office and Staff Remuneration and Conditions.

His daughter is Dame Lynne Owens.

Honours

Commonwealth honours
 Commonwealth honours

Scholastic

 Honorary Degrees

References 

1946 births
Living people
Chief Constables of West Midlands Police
Knights Bachelor
Metropolitan Police officers
Deputy Lieutenants of the West Midlands (county)
English recipients of the Queen's Police Medal
Officers of the Order of St John